Marco De Lauri (born 21 November 1997) known professionally as Sethu is an Italian singer and rapper.

Biography 

De Lauri was born in Savona and then, together with his twin brother, later settled in Milan. He showed an immediate interest in music from an early age, starting to perform in various local punk bands before devoting himself entirely to hip hop music. The pseudonym he uses is an homage to the album At the Gate of Sethu by the death metal band Nile.

In 2018 he released his debut EP Spero ti renda triste..., in collaboration with his twin brother Giorgio De Lauri, known professionally as Jiz. The EP deviated from his previous works by being influenced by genres such as trap music.

In 2019, the release of singles such as "Butterfly Knife" and "Hotspot", which enabled the artist to achieve national notoriety, allowed Sethu to be included in the "CBCR of the Year" list compiled by Italian magazine RockIT.

In September 2022, after obtaining a contract with Carosello Records, he released the single "Giro di notte", with which he was named "Artist of the Month" in the MTV New Generation. Sethu manage to qualify in the top six, with his entry "Sottoterra", by rightfully accessing the festival in the  category. "Cause perse" was later announced as his entry for the Sanremo Music Festival 2023. Sethu finished last, in 28th position at Sanremo.

Discography

Extended plays

Singles

As featured artist

References 

Italian hip hop musicians
Italian singers
Italian rappers
1997 births
Living people
People from Savona